Ri Yong-ho may refer to the following two people:

 Ri Yong-ho (general) (1942 – presumed dead since 2012), a North Korean military officer
 Ri Yong-ho (diplomat) (born 1956), Minister of Foreign Affairs of North Korea 2016–2020

See also 
 Lee Young-ho, South Korean professional StarCraft player